Martha Mitchell Zoller (born August 23, 1959) is a columnist, media personality, author, and former Republican candidate for the United States House of Representatives.

Personal
Born on August 23, 1959, to Frank and Juanita Mitchell (née Roof), Martha Zoller's father was a veteran of World War II in Europe and a POW escapee. Her mother worked with the Rich's company in downtown Atlanta, Georgia. The youngest of four children, Zoller attended Columbia High School in south DeKalb County before going on to graduate from the University of Georgia Grady School in 1979 with a degree in journalism.  After college, Martha started her career as a corporate buyer for the Rich's company in Atlanta, Georgia.

Broadcasting
Zoller began broadcasting in 1994 as co-host of the Mid-Day program on WDUN AM 550 in Gainesville after being a regular caller to the station. Her first call was prompted by Hillary Clinton's lament that "she could have stayed at home and baked cookies." Her show had an un-abashed conservative focus, as was made clear following the 2006 live broadcast of her show from the White House lawn when she said of the White House administration "You know, what I say is, use me!".

According to her website Zoller makes regular appearances on Fox 5 Atlanta's The Georgia Gang and frequent guest appearances on cable channels such as CNN, Fox News, and MSNBC, on programs including TalkBack Live, Hannity & Colmes, and Larry King Live, and Zoller-penned opinion pieces have been published in the Atlanta Journal-Constitution. Zoller was named one of Talkers magazine’s 'Heavy Hundred' talk shows in America in 2005, 2006, 2007 and 2009, and claims on her website to have been named to the 2005 Georgia Trend Magazine "Most Important Media People" list and the 2005 and 2006 James Magazine "Most Influential Georgians" lists.

In 2008, The Martha Zoller Show, originating from North Georgia's News-Talk station FM 103.7 WXKT which served the Gainesville metropolitan area, Maysville, and Athens, was syndicated statewide on the Georgia News Network until she ended her show to run for Congress.

Blogs

On April 6, Martha released a new political website: ZPolitics.com

Military
In 2005, Zoller visited Baghdad, Iraq with the "Voices of Soldiers" Tour and participated in the Joint Civilian Orientation Conference (JCOC), a United States Department of Defense program for "America's leaders interested in expanding their knowledge of the military and national defense". Martha returned to Iraq in January 2007.

Congressional campaign
Martha ran for US Congress as a conservative Republican for the new congressional seat allocated to Georgia following the 2010 United States Census.  She had been endorsed by:

former presidential candidate Herman Cain
Georgia Right to Life 
She-PAC  
Tea Party Express
FreedomWorks PAC
former United States Senator Rick Santorum
former United States Speaker of the House Newt Gingrich

Works
 Indivisible: Uniting Values for a Divided America (Stroud & Hall Publishers), 2005

See also
 List of radio stations in Georgia (U.S. state)

References

External links
Martha Zoller's official website

1959 births
Living people
American columnists
American talk radio hosts
American women radio presenters
American television hosts
American women television presenters
American political writers
University of Georgia alumni
Writers from Columbus, Georgia
American women columnists
Georgia (U.S. state) Republicans